Cedron is a ghost town in Lincoln County, Kansas, United States.

History
Cedron was issued a post office in 1871. The post office was discontinued in 1911.

References

Former populated places in Lincoln County, Kansas
Former populated places in Kansas